Wujek (literally "uncle," in Polish) can refer to:
 Wujek Coal Mine, a mine where 9 workers were killed during a famous 1981 strike
 Jakub Wujek, a 16th-century Polish Jesuit who translated the Bible into Polish
 Wujek, Lublin Voivodeship, a village in east Poland